The Kopli cemetery ( or) was Estonia's largest Lutheran Baltic German cemetery, located in the suburb of Kopli in Tallinn. It contained thousands of graves of prominent citizens of Tallinn and stood from 1774 to shortly after World War II, when it was completely flattened and destroyed by the Soviet occupation authorities governing the country at the time. The former cemetery is now a public park.

Origins and use
Between 1771 and 1772, Catherine the Great, empress of the Russian Empire, issued an edict which decreed that from that point on, no-one who died (regardless of their social standing or class origins) was to be buried in a church crypt or churchyard; all burials were to take place in new cemeteries to be built throughout Russia, located outside town boundaries.

These measures were intended to overcome the congestion of urban church crypts and graveyards, and were prompted by a number of outbreaks of highly contagious diseases linked to inadequate burial practices in urban areas, especially the black plague, which had led to the 1771 Plague Riot in Moscow.

The cemetery at Kopli was founded in 1774 on the outskirts of Tallinn. It was divided into two sections: the western part was used for the deceased belonging to the St. Nicholas' Church parish, while the eastern part was reserved for those of the St. Olaf's Church parish.

The cemetery served as a burial ground for over 170 years for almost all Baltic Germans who died in the city between 1774 and 1944. In 1939, it contained thousands of well-kept graves of many prominent citizens of Tallinn.

Brotherhood Cemetery of the Russian Army
Since 1921, on the southern outskirts of the cemetery, there was a burial place for the lower ranks and officers of the russian Northwestern Army, who died in the typhoid hospitals after the end of the Russian Civil War and Estonian War of Independence. Since 1936, the St. George Chapel by the architect A.I. Vladovsky has stood on the territory of the cemetery, which was destroyed in Soviet times and restored in 2022.

Final burials
Burials at the cemetery were drastically reduced after Adolf Hitler's forced transfer, under the Molotov–Ribbentrop Pact, of tens of thousands of Baltic Germans from Estonia and Latvia to areas in western Poland in late 1939.

Burials at the cemetery continued on a much smaller scale until 1944, principally among those Baltic Germans who had refused to leave the region.

Destruction by Soviet authorities
Shortly after World War II, during the second occupation of Baltic states, the suburb of Kopli, because of its strategic position as a base for the Red Army on the Gulf of Finland, was turned into a restricted zone for the Soviet military and closed to the public.

Around 1950–1951, the cemetery was entirely flattened by Russian Soviet authorities. Gravestones were used to build walls along the ports and sidewalks in other parts of the city and no trace of the cemetery was left standing.

Soviet administration also destroyed two further 17th- and 18th-century cemeteries in the city, in Kalamaja and Mõigu, which belonged to the ethnic Estonian and Baltic German communities.

In contrast, the Russian Orthodox Cemetery, also established in the 18th century, south of the old town of Tallinn, was left standing.

Current status
Presently, the former area of the cemetery is a public park, with no immediate visible indication of its previous status. The only surviving evidence of those who were interred there consists of the parish registers of burials and some old detailed maps of the area in the Tallinn city archives.

Gallery

Notable interments
 Eduard Bornhöhe (1862–1923), Estonian writer (reburied to Metsakalmistu)
 Various members of the Burchart family who owned and managed the Raeapteek in Tallinn
 Login Geiden (1773–1850), Dutch-born Russian admiral
 Franz Kluge, publisher
 Artur Korjus (1870–1936), Estonian military officer, father of opera singer Miliza Korjus
 Karl von Kügelgen (1772–1832), Russian painter
 Rudolf Carl Georg Lehbert (1858–1928), pharmacist and botanist
 Charles Leroux (1856–1889), American balloonist and parachutist
 Gertrud Elisabeth Mara (1749–1833), German opera singer
 Carl Julius Albert Paucker (1798–1856), Baltic German historian
 Netty Pinna (1883–1937), Estonian actress, wife of actor Paul Pinna (reburied to Metsakalmistu)
 Karl Friedrich Wilhelm Rußwurm (1812–1883), Baltic German historian, ethnographer and folklorist
 Aleksander Silberg (1869–1926), Estonian military Major-General
 Sophie Tieck (1775–1833), German writer and poet
 Konstantin Türnpu (1865–1927), Estonian composer, choirmaster and organist

See also
 List of cemeteries in Estonia
 Mõigu cemetery
 Kalamaja cemetery
 Raadi cemetery
 Great Cemetery (Riga)
 Nazi-Soviet population transfers
 Baltic Germans

References in literature
The cemetery features several times in the short story collection Der Tod von Reval (The Death from Tallinn) by the Baltic German author Werner Bergengruen.

  Adolf Richters Baltische Verkehrs- und Adreßbücher, Band 3-Estland, Riga 1913
  Schmidt, Christoph. Bergengruens Tod von Reval aus historischer Sicht. Journal of Baltic Studies, 29:4 (1998), 315–325
  Tallinna Kalmistud, Karl Laane, Tallinn, 2002.

External links

 Image of a very detailed historical map from the year 1904 showing only the western part of the cemetery with all numbered grave plots
 Image of a historical map from the year 1881 showing the cemetery and the whole Kopli peninsula
 News article on the history of the cemetery, in Estonian, from 2004
 News article on the history of the cemetery, in Estonian from 2000
 Notes on the cemetery as a park, in Estonian

Baltic-German people
1951 in Estonia
Demolished buildings and structures in Estonia
Former cemeteries
German cemeteries
Lutheran cemeteries
1774 establishments in Europe
1951 disestablishments
Cemeteries in Tallinn
18th-century establishments in Estonia